Cabreriella is a genus of flowering plants in the aster family, Asteraceae. It is native to South America.

 Species

 Cabreriella oppositicordia - Colombia, Venezuela
 Cabreriella sanctae-martae - Colombia (Cesar and Magdalena regions)

References 

Senecioneae
Asteraceae genera
Flora of South America